Kosmos 78 or Zenit-2 No.30 was a Soviet, first generation, low resolution, optical film-return reconnaissance satellite launched in 1965.

Kosmos 78 was launched by a Vostok-2 rocket, serial number U15001-02, flying from Site 31/6 at the Baikonur Cosmodrome. The launch took place at 11:17 GMT on 14 August 1965, and following its successful arrival in orbit the spacecraft received its Kosmos designation; along with the International Designator 1965-066A and the Satellite Catalog Number 01505.

On 22 August 1965, after eight days of operation the satellite was deorbited, with its return capsule descending by parachute for recovery by Soviet force.

References

Kosmos satellites
Spacecraft launched in 1965
Spacecraft which reentered in 1965
Zenit-2 satellites